Thomas Holland (16 July 1902 – July 1987) was an English professional footballer  who played for clubs including Watford and Gillingham. He made nearly 120 Football League appearances for Gillingham.

References

1902 births
1987 deaths
Footballers from Sheffield
English footballers
Association football goalkeepers
Rotherham Town F.C. (1899) players
Doncaster Rovers F.C. players
Weymouth F.C. players
Exeter City F.C. players
Watford F.C. players
Gillingham F.C. players
K Sports F.C. players